Poecilimon is a genus of bush crickets in the subfamily Phaneropterinae and  tribe Barbitistini.  Species can be found in: central and Southeast Europe (including Italy and the Southern Alps, Southern Hungary, Romania, Bulgaria), the south of the European part of the former USSR, Asia Minor, Syria, Palestine, the Caucasus, Persia and extends in Central Asia to the Altai mountains.

Description
Because Poecilimon species are often brightly coloured, they may be called "bright bush crickets", although some are mostly green. As with many Orthoptera, colouration can be misleading, with variability within species.  Often there is a stripe behind the eyes, dorsally dark and can extend beyond the pronotum.  The fastigium is broader to narrower than the scapus. The pronotum is often shiny, smooth, and often rounded dorsally. These insects are often brachypterous and females can be apterous. In the males, the cerci are very different, but are always more or less conical in the females. The ovipositor is always straight and slightly curved upwards and serrated. The antennae are monochrome or ringed and about three times as long as the body.

Species
The Orthoptera Species File lists:
subgenus Hamatopoecilimon Heller, 2011
 Poecilimon deplanatus Brunner von Wattenwyl, 1891
 Poecilimon hamatus Brunner von Wattenwyl, 1878
 Poecilimon ikariensis Willemse, 1982
 Poecilimon klausgerhardi Fontana, 2004
 Poecilimon paros Heller & Reinhold, 1992
 Poecilimon unispinosus Brunner von Wattenwyl, 1878
subgenus Poecilimon Fischer, 1853

 species group ampliatus Brunner von Wattenwyl, 1878
 Poecilimon amissus Brunner von Wattenwyl, 1878
 Poecilimon ampliatus Brunner von Wattenwyl, 1878
 Poecilimon ataturki Ünal, 1999
 Poecilimon ebneri Ramme, 1933
 Poecilimon glandifer Karabag, 1950
 Poecilimon intermedius (Fieber, 1853)
 Poecilimon marmaraensis Naskrecki, 1991
 species group armeniacus (Uvarov, 1921)
 Poecilimon armeniacus (Uvarov, 1921)
 Poecilimon eskishehirensis Ünal, 2003
 Poecilimon excisus Karabag, 1950
 Poecilimon ferwillemsei Ünal, 2010
 Poecilimon harveyi Karabag, 1964
 Poecilimon haydari Ramme, 1951
 Poecilimon inopinatus Ünal, 2010
 Poecilimon karabagi (Ramme, 1942)
 species group bosphoricus Brunner von Wattenwyl, 1878
 Poecilimon athos Tilmans, Willemse & Willemse, 1989
 Poecilimon bidens Retowski, 1889
 Poecilimon bischoffi Ramme, 1933
 Poecilimon bosphoricus Brunner von Wattenwyl, 1878
 Poecilimon canakkale Kaya, Chobanov & Çiplak, 2015
 Poecilimon cervus Karabag, 1950
 Poecilimon demirsoyi Sevgili, 2001
 Poecilimon diversus Ünal, 2010
 Poecilimon djakonovi Miram, 1938
 Poecilimon geoktschajcus Stshelkanovtzev, 1910
 Poecilimon heinrichi (Ramme, 1951)
 Poecilimon istanbul Ünal, 2010
 Poecilimon kocaki Ünal, 1999
 Poecilimon miramae Ramme, 1933
 Poecilimon naskrecki Ünal, 2001
 Poecilimon oligacanthus Miram, 1938
 Poecilimon pliginskii Miram, 1929
 Poecilimon roseoviridis Chobanov & Kaya, 2012
 Poecilimon scythicus Stshelkanovtzev, 1911
 Poecilimon similis Retowski, 1889
 Poecilimon sureyanus Uvarov, 1930
 Poecilimon tauricus Retowski, 1888
 Poecilimon turciae (Ramme, 1951)
 Poecilimon turcicus Karabag, 1950
 Poecilimon warchalowskae Chobanov, Kaya & Çiplak, 2015

 species group celebi Karabag, 1953
 Poecilimon celebi Karabag, 1953
 Poecilimon iucundus Ünal, 2003
 species group concinnus Brunner von Wattenwyl, 1878
 Poecilimon cervoides Karabag, 1964
 Poecilimon concinnus Brunner von Wattenwyl, 1878
 Poecilimon hatti Ünal, 2004
 Poecilimon longicercus Ünal, 2010
 Poecilimon xenocercus Karabag, 1956
 species group davisi Karabag, 1953
 Poecilimon davisi Karabag, 1953
 species group elegans Brunner von Wattenwyl, 1878
 Poecilimon albolineatus Ingrisch & Pavićević, 2010
 Poecilimon elegans Brunner von Wattenwyl, 1878
 species group heroicus Stshelkanovtzev, 1911
 Poecilimon bifenestratus Miram, 1929
 Poecilimon heroicus Stshelkanovtzev, 1911
 Poecilimon tricuspis Miram, 1926
 Poecilimon tschorochensis Adelung, 1907
 species group inflatus Brunner von Wattenwyl, 1891
 Poecilimon antalyaensis (Karabag, 1975)
 Poecilimon bilgeri Karabag, 1953
 Poecilimon cretensis Werner, 1903
 Poecilimon inflatus Brunner von Wattenwyl, 1891
 Poecilimon isopterus Kaya & Chobanov, 2018
 Poecilimon martinae Heller, 2004
 species group jonicus (Fieber, 1853)
 Poecilimon erimanthos Willemse & Heller, 1992
 Poecilimon jonicus (Fieber, 1853)  – type species (as Barbitistes jonicus Fieber = P. jonicus jonicus)
 Poecilimon laevissimus (Fischer, 1853)
 Poecilimon tessellatus (Fischer, 1853)
 Poecilimon werneri Ramme, 1933
 species group luschani Ramme, 1933
 Poecilimon egrigozi Ünal, 2005
 Poecilimon helleri Boztepe, Kaya & Çiplak, 2013
 Poecilimon ledereri Ramme, 1933
 Poecilimon luschani Ramme, 1933
 Poecilimon orbelicus Pančić, 1883
 Poecilimon tuncayi Karabag, 1953
 species group minutus Karabag, 1975
 Poecilimon doga Ünal, 2004
 Poecilimon karakushi Ünal, 2003
 Poecilimon minutus Karabag, 1975
 Poecilimon solus Ünal, 2010
 species group ornatus (Schmidt, 1850)
 Poecilimon affinis (Frivaldszky, 1868)
 Poecilimon artedentatus Heller, 1984
 Poecilimon gracilioides Willemse & Heller, 1992
 Poecilimon gracilis (Fieber, 1853)
 Poecilimon hoelzeli Harz, 1966
 Poecilimon jablanicensis Chobanov & Heller, 2010
 Poecilimon nobilis Brunner von Wattenwyl, 1878
 Poecilimon nonveilleri Ingrisch & Pavićević, 2010
 Poecilimon obesus Brunner von Wattenwyl, 1878
 Poecilimon ornatus (Schmidt, 1850)
 Poecilimon pindos Willemse, 1982
 Poecilimon pseudornatus Ingrisch & Pavićević, 2010
 Poecilimon soulion Willemse, 1987
 species group pergamicus Brunner von Wattenwyl, 1891
 Poecilimon kutahiensis Werner, 1901
 Poecilimon pergamicus Brunner von Wattenwyl, 1891
 species group propinquus Brunner von Wattenwyl, 1878
 Poecilimon aegaeus Werner, 1932
 Poecilimon chopardi Ramme, 1933
 Poecilimon gerlindae Lehmann, Willemse & Heller, 2006
 Poecilimon mariannae Willemse & Heller, 1992
 Poecilimon propinquus Brunner von Wattenwyl, 1878
 Poecilimon thessalicus Brunner von Wattenwyl, 1891
 Poecilimon veluchianus Ramme, 1933
 Poecilimon zimmeri Ramme, 1933
 species group sanctipauli Brunner von Wattenwyl, 1878
 Poecilimon lodosi Harz, 1975
 Poecilimon mytilenensis Werner, 1932
 Poecilimon pulcher Brunner von Wattenwyl, 1891
 Poecilimon sanctipauli Brunner von Wattenwyl, 1878
 species group syriacus Brunner von Wattenwyl, 1891
 Poecilimon adentatus Ramme, 1933
 Poecilimon angulatus Uvarov, 1939
 Poecilimon ege Ünal, 2005
 Poecilimon ersisi Salman, 1978
 Poecilimon izmirensis Ramme, 1933
 Poecilimon karabukensis Ünal, 2003
 Poecilimon obtusicercus Heller, Sevgili & Reinhold, 2008
 Poecilimon serratus Karabag, 1962
 Poecilimon syriacus Brunner von Wattenwyl, 1891
 Poecilimon toros Ünal, 2003
 species group zonatus Bolívar, 1899
 Poecilimon azizsancar Sevgili, 2018
 Poecilimon ciplaki Kaya, 2018
 Poecilimon isozonatus Kaya, 2018
 Poecilimon salmani Sevgili, 2018
 Poecilimon tauricola Ramme, 1951
 Poecilimon varicornis (Haan, 1843)
 Poecilimon variicercis Miram, 1938
 Poecilimon vodnensis Karaman, 1958
 Poecilimon zonatus Bolívar, 1899
 species group not assigned
 Poecilimon brunneri (Frivaldszky, 1868)
 Poecilimon chostae Stshelkanovtzev, 1935
 Poecilimon distinctus Stshelkanovtzev, 1910
 Poecilimon flavescens (Herrich-Schäffer, 1838)
 Poecilimon fussii Fieber, 1878
 Poecilimon guichardi Karabag, 1964
 Poecilimon hadjisarandou Werner, 1938
 Poecilimon lateralis (Fieber, 1853)
 Poecilimon macedonicus Ramme, 1926
 Poecilimon neglectus Ramme, 1931
 Poecilimon pechevi Andreeva, 1978
 Poecilimon schmidtii (Fieber, 1853)
 Poecilimon stschelkanovzevi Tarbinsky, 1932
 Poecilimon thoracicus (Fieber, 1853)
 Poecilimon ukrainicus Bey-Bienko, 1951
 Poecilimon zwicki Ramme, 1939

References

External links 
 
 

Tettigoniidae genera
Phaneropterinae
Orthoptera of Asia
Orthoptera of Europe